Wagner Spur is a pointed rock and ice spur along the north flank of Pryor Glacier, 11 nautical miles (20 km) southeast of Mount Gorton, at the southeast extremity of Wilson Hills. Mapped by United States Geological Survey (USGS) from surveys and U.S. Navy aerial photography, 1960–62. Named by Advisory Committee on Antarctic Names (US-ACAN) for John E. Wagner, worker in the field of glaciology at McMurdo Station, 1967–68.

References
 

Ridges of Oates Land